Sergio Tadeu Corrêia Guizé (born 14 May 1980) is a Brazilian actor. He is known for starring in several Brazilian telenovelas and films.

Filmography

Television

Film

Awards and nominations

References

External links

1980 births
Living people
Male actors from São Paulo (state)
Brazilian male telenovela actors
Brazilian male film actors
Brazilian male television actors
People from Santo André, São Paulo